The Alpina B10 Bi-Turbo is a high performance version of the BMW 5 Series E34 executive car manufactured by German automobile manufacturer Alpina. Beginning production in 1989, the B10 Bi-Turbo was based on the 535i and received several upgrades by Alpina, being the fastest production sedan in the world at the time of its introduction. Production ended in 1994 with 507 examples produced.

Developed at a cost of US$3.2 million, the B10 Bi-Turbo was introduced at the Geneva Motor Show in March 1989.

Specifications 
To build each B10 Bi-Turbo powerplant, Alpina dismantled a BMW M30 engine, replaced the stock pistons with forged Mahle units, installed two Garrett T25 water-cooled turbochargers, and added a Bosch variable boost control with range of 0.4–0.8 bar, adjustable from the driver's seat. A Getrag 290 5-speed manual transmission was specified to handle the power.

Modifications to the suspension included Alpina-specific springs and anti-roll bars. Bilstein shock absorbers were used at the front and automatic-load levelling units by Fichtel & Sachs were used at the rear. Front brake rotors were large  discs from UK-based Lucas Girling, bigger even than the  pieces found on the E34 M5. Michelin MXX tyres were standard as was BMW's Automatic Stability Control (ASC).

Performance 
Alpina claimed a 0–100 km/h (62 mph) acceleration time of 5.6 seconds and a top speed of over 290 km/h (180.2 mph), putting it in the same league as a five years older car model Ferrari Testarossa in terms of performance. In the September 1991 issue of Road & Track, Paul Frère wrote: "For me this is the car … I think this is the best 4-door in the world."  Despite a base price tag of 146,800 DM, nearly twice the price of an E34 M5, the B10 Bi-Turbo became the best-selling single model in Alpina history up until that point. The six year production run began in 1989 and ended in August 1994. Production ended due to the discontinuation of the M30 engine by BMW in 1993. The final 50 M30 engine blocks were shipped to Alpina for use in the final 50 cars.

Independent performance test results 

 0–: 5.2 seconds
 0–: 19.7 seconds
 0–400 m: 13.2 seconds
 0–1,000 m: 24.6 seconds
 0–: 5.1 seconds
 0–: 11.6 seconds
 Standing  mile (402m): 13.6 seconds at 
 Top speed:

Technical data 

[Figures in brackets refer to Swiss market vehicles]

Gallery

Bibliography 
  Götz Leyrer, « Fünfer Potenz », Auto, Motor und Sport, #24, 17 November 1989 (B10 Bi-Turbo, BMW M5 and AC Schnitzer S5 3.7 comparison).
  HB, « Die B-Handlung », Sport Auto, #5, May 1990 (Alpina B10 Bi-Turbo, B6 3.5S and B12 5.0 comparison).
  Götz Leyrer, « Duell in der Wonne », Auto, Motor und Sport, #13, 1990 (B10 Bi-Turbo and Ferrari 348 TB comparison).
  « Croisière à 300 à l'heure », Auto Hebdo, #749, 17 October 1990. (B10 Bi-Turbo and Ruf CTR comparison).
  Auto Hebdo Sport, #391, November 1990. (B10 Bi-Turbo and Ruf CTR comparison).
  Kevin Blick, « Vintage Alpina », Performance Car, November 1990. (B10 Bi-Turbo review). 
  « Der Sinn des Strebens », Auto, Motor und Sport, #3, 1991 (B10 Bi-Turbo, BMW M5, Opel Lotus Omega and Mercedes-Benz 500E comparison).
  « World's fastest cars », Road & Track, #9, September 1991 (sports car comparison: Lamborghini, Ferrari, Corvette ZR4, Ruf…).
  « 360CV dans une berline au sommet », BMWorld, #4 (B10 Bi-Turbo review).
  « Saloonacy », Classic & Sports car, #1, 2004 (B10 Bi-Turbo and Opel Lotus Omega comparison).
  Maxime Joly, Alpina B10 Biturbo e34 (1989 - 1994) : Autoroute racer, automobile-sportive.com, 27 February 2010 (retrieved 9 March 2014).
  Alexander Bernt, Alpinas Turbo-Tiere, Auto Bild, 9 June 2011 (Retrieved 7 December 2014)
 .

References 

B10 (Bi-Turbo)
Rear-wheel-drive vehicles
Sports sedans
1990s cars
Cars introduced in 1989
Cars discontinued in 1994